Stephen George Russell (born 13 March 1945) is a retired English first-class cricket player and businessman.

Russell attended Tiffin School before going up to Trinity Hall, Cambridge. Opening the bowling and showing "commendable control at a lively pace", he won his cricket Blue for Cambridge University in 1965 and took 4 for 50 and 4 for 32 against Oxford University.

He had his best season in 1966, taking 41 wickets in 14 first-class matches for Cambridge at an average of 25.24. In Cambridge's sole victory that year, over Scotland, he took 3 for 49 and 5 for 41, including the first four wickets in Scotland's second innings, and then, coming in to bat at his usual position of number 11 with Cambridge needing 42 runs to win, he stayed with Rupert Roopnaraine while the runs were scored. He took 5 for 60 against Oxford, but Cambridge lost by an innings.

He "proved an inspiring captain" for Cambridge in 1967, but was less successful as a bowler, taking 19 wickets in 11 matches at an average of 44.26. He played one match for Surrey at the end of the season, taking two wickets.

He went into business, and was a director of Boots UK.

References

External links

1945 births
Living people
People from Sutton, London
People educated at Tiffin School
Alumni of Trinity Hall, Cambridge
English cricketers
Cambridge University cricketers
Surrey cricketers
20th-century English businesspeople
21st-century English businesspeople